Virginia Dementricia (1842 – after 1861), was an enslaved woman on Aruba in the Dutch West Indies. She was enslaved by the planter Jan van der Biest, and was punished for a number of acts against slavery between 1859 and 1861. She was sold in 1861, after which there are no traces of her, but slavery was abolished in 1863, a mere two years later. Historically, she has become a symbolic figure and heroine for the fight against slavery on Aruba.

References

1842 births
19th-century Dutch people
Slavery in the Caribbean
Women in war in the Caribbean
Rebel slaves
Year of death unknown
Women in 19th-century warfare
Women in war in the Netherlands
19th-century people of the Dutch Empire
19th-century slaves
Aruban people of African descent